Acyclic may refer to:
 In chemistry, a compound which is an open-chain compound, e.g. alkanes and acyclic aliphatic compounds
 In mathematics:
 A graph without a cycle, especially
 A directed acyclic graph
 An acyclic complex is a chain complex all of whose homology groups are zero
 In economics, an economic indicator with little or no correlation to the business cycle